Curtis Fuller with Red Garland is an album by trombonist Curtis Fuller with pianist Red Garland recorded in 1957 and originally released on the New Jazz label, a subsidiary of Prestige Records in 1963.

Reception

In his review for Allmusic, Scott Yanow stated "Despite the overly critical liner notes (written in 1962), this is an excellent hard-bop oriented date".

Track listing
 "Seeing Red" (Sonny Red, Barry Harris) - 7:35
 "Stormy Weather" (Harold Arlen, Ted Koehler) - 7:00   
 "Cashmere" (Curtis Fuller)  - 7:17   
 "Slenderella" (Sonny Red) - 6:45   
 "Moonlight Becomes You" (Johnny Burke, Jimmy Van Heusen) - 7:43
 "Roc and Troll" (Teddy Charles) - 7:42

Personnel
Curtis Fuller - trombone - except track 5
Red Garland - piano
Sonny Red - alto saxophone - except track 2
Paul Chambers - bass 
Louis Hayes - drums

References 

Prestige Records albums
Curtis Fuller albums
Red Garland albums
1963 albums
Albums recorded at Van Gelder Studio
Albums produced by Bob Weinstock